The Mississippi Armed Forces Museum is located at Camp Shelby, approximately 12 miles (19 km) south of Hattiesburg, Mississippi. The Armed Forces Museum serves as the military history museum for the State of Mississippi. It is a member of the Army Museum System.

Museum objective
The purpose of the museum is to honor the service and sacrifices of Mississippi veterans from all military branches.

Museum description
Two military veterans started the museum in 1984 with their personal collection of war artifacts.  At that time, the museum was housed in a small room of a warehouse at Camp Shelby.

In 2001, a  facility was completed.  The museum contained  of exhibits, 17,000 artifacts, 4,500 volumes of military history, and 2,000 historical documents.

In February 2015, the museum was closed for expansion. The museum was officially reopened by the Governor of Mississippi on October 27, 2016.

Museum exhibits
Within the museum building are eight galleries for viewing exhibits: late 19th century conflicts, World War I, World War II, Korean War, Vietnam War, Desert Storm, Global War on Terrorism, and Medal of Honor. Military weapons, equipment, clothing, and medals are on display.

Outdoor exhibits include aircraft, tanks, field artillery, and memorials.

Gallery

See also
 African American Military History Museum

References

External links
 

Museums in Forrest County, Mississippi
History of Mississippi
Military and war museums in Mississippi
United States Army museums
1984 establishments in Mississippi
Camp Shelby